The effective population size (Ne) is a number that, in some simplified scenarios, corresponds to the number of breeding individuals in the population. More generally, Ne is the number of individuals that an idealised population would need to have in order for some specified quantity of interest (typically change of genetic diversity or inbreeding rates) to be the same as in the real population. Idealised populations are based on unrealistic but convenient simplifications such as random mating, simultaneous birth of each new generation, constant population size, and equal numbers of children per parent. For most quantities of interest and most real populations, the effective population size Ne is usually smaller than the census population size N of a real population. The same population may have multiple effective population sizes, for different properties of interest, including for different genetic loci.

The effective population size is most commonly measured with respect to the coalescence time. In an idealised diploid population with no selection at any locus, the expectation of the coalescence time in generations is equal to twice the census population size. In a population with selection at many loci and abundant linkage disequilibrium, the coalescent effective population size may not reflect the census population size at all, or may reflect its logarithm.

The concept of effective population size was introduced in the field of population genetics in 1931 by the American geneticist Sewall Wright.

Overview: Types of effective population size 
Depending on the quantity of interest, effective population size can be defined in several ways. Ronald Fisher and Sewall Wright originally defined it as "the number of breeding individuals in an idealised population that would show the same amount of dispersion of allele frequencies under random genetic drift or the same amount of inbreeding as the population under consideration". More generally, an effective population size may be defined as the number of individuals in an idealised population that has a value of any given population genetic quantity that is equal to the value of that quantity in the population of interest. The two population genetic quantities identified by Wright were the one-generation increase in variance across replicate populations (variance effective population size) and the one-generation change in the inbreeding coefficient (inbreeding effective population size). These two are closely linked, and derived from F-statistics, but they are not identical.

Today, the effective population size is usually estimated empirically with respect to the sojourn or coalescence time, estimated as the within-species genetic diversity divided by the mutation rate, yielding a coalescent effective population size. Another important effective population size is the selection effective population size 1/scritical, where scritical is the critical value of the selection coefficient at which selection becomes more important than genetic drift.

Empirical measurements 
In Drosophila populations of census size 16, the variance effective population size has been measured as equal to 11.5. This measurement was achieved through studying changes in the frequency of a neutral allele from one generation to another in over 100 replicate populations.

For coalescent effective population sizes, a survey of publications on 102 mostly wildlife animal and plant species yielded 192 Ne/N ratios. Seven different estimation methods were used in the surveyed studies. Accordingly, the ratios ranged widely from 10-6 for Pacific oysters to 0.994 for humans, with an average of 0.34 across the examined species. A genealogical analysis of human hunter-gatherers (Eskimos) determined the effective-to-census population size ratio for haploid (mitochondrial DNA, Y chromosomal DNA), and diploid (autosomal DNA) loci separately: the ratio of the effective to the census population size was estimated as 0.6–0.7 for autosomal and X-chromosomal DNA, 0.7–0.9 for mitochondrial DNA and 0.5 for Y-chromosomal DNA.

Variance effective size 
In the Wright-Fisher idealized population model, the conditional variance of the allele frequency , given the allele frequency  in the previous generation, is

Let  denote the same, typically larger, variance in the actual population under consideration. The variance effective population size  is defined as the size of an idealized population with the same variance.

Theoretical examples 

In the following examples, one or more of the assumptions of a strictly idealised population are relaxed, while other assumptions are retained. The variance effective population size of the more relaxed population model is then calculated with respect to the strict model.

Variations in population size 

Population size varies over time.  Suppose there are t non-overlapping generations, then effective population size is given by the harmonic mean of the population sizes:

For example, say the population size was N = 10, 100, 50, 80, 20, 500 for six generations (t = 6).  Then the effective population size is the harmonic mean of these, giving:

{|
|-
|
|
|-
|
|
|-
|
|
|-
|
|
|}

Note this is less than the arithmetic mean of the population size, which in this example is 126.7. The harmonic mean tends to be dominated by the smallest bottleneck that the population goes through.

Dioeciousness 

If a population is dioecious, i.e. there is no self-fertilisation then

or more generally,

where D represents dioeciousness and may take the value 0 (for not dioecious) or 1 for dioecious.

When N is large, Ne approximately equals N, so this is usually trivial and often ignored:

Variance in reproductive success 

If population size is to remain constant, each individual must contribute on average two gametes to the next generation.  An idealized population assumes that this follows a Poisson distribution so that the variance of the number of gametes contributed, k is equal to the mean number contributed, i.e. 2:

However, in natural populations the variance is often larger than this. The vast majority of individuals may have no offspring, and the next generation stems only from a small number of individuals, so

The effective population size is then smaller, and given by:

Note that if the variance of k is less than 2,  Ne is greater than N.  In the extreme case of a population experiencing no variation in family size, in a laboratory population in which the number of offspring is artificially controlled, Vk = 0 and Ne = 2N.

Non-Fisherian sex-ratios 

When the sex ratio of a population varies from the Fisherian 1:1 ratio,  effective population size is given by:

Where Nm is the number of males and Nf the number of females.  For example, with 80 males and 20 females (an absolute population size of 100):
{|
|-
|
|
|-
|
|
|-
|
|
|}

Again, this results in Ne being less than N.

Inbreeding effective size

Alternatively, the effective population size may be defined by noting how the average inbreeding coefficient changes from one generation to the next, and then defining Ne as the size of the idealized population that has the same change in average inbreeding coefficient as the population under consideration.  The presentation follows Kempthorne (1957).

For the idealized population, the inbreeding coefficients follow the recurrence equation

Using Panmictic Index (1 − F) instead of inbreeding coefficient, we get the approximate recurrence equation

The difference per generation is

The inbreeding effective size can be found by solving

This is

although researchers rarely use this equation directly.

Theoretical example: overlapping generations and age-structured populations 

When organisms live longer than one breeding season, effective population sizes have to take into account the life tables for the species.

Haploid 
Assume a haploid population with discrete age structure.  An example might be an organism that can survive several discrete breeding seasons.  Further, define the following age structure characteristics:

  Fisher's reproductive value for age ,

  The chance an individual will survive to age , and

  The number of newborn individuals per breeding season.

The generation time is calculated as

  average age of a reproducing individual

Then, the inbreeding effective population size is

Diploid 
Similarly, the inbreeding effective number can be calculated for a diploid population with discrete age structure.  This was first given by Johnson, but the notation more closely resembles Emigh and Pollak.

Assume the same basic parameters for the life table as given for the haploid case, but distinguishing between male and female, such as N0ƒ and N0m for the number of newborn females and males, respectively (notice lower case ƒ for females, compared to upper case F for inbreeding).

The inbreeding effective number is

Coalescent effective size 

According to the neutral theory of molecular evolution, a neutral allele remains in a population for Ne generations, where Ne is the effective population size. An idealised diploid population will have a pairwise nucleotide diversity equal to 4Ne, where  is the mutation rate. The sojourn effective population size can therefore be estimated empirically by dividing the nucleotide diversity by the mutation rate.

The coalescent effective size may have little relationship to the number of individuals physically present in a population. Measured coalescent effective population sizes vary between genes in the same population, being low in genome areas of low recombination and high in genome areas of high recombination. Sojourn times are proportional to N in neutral theory, but for alleles under selection, sojourn times are proportional to log(N). Genetic hitchhiking can cause neutral mutations to have sojourn times proportional to log(N): this may explain the relationship between measured effective population size and the local recombination rate.

Selection effective size 

In an idealised Wright-Fisher model, the fate of an allele, beginning at an intermediate frequency, is largely determined by selection if the selection coefficient s ≫ 1/N, and largely determined by neutral genetic drift if s ≪ 1/N. In real populations, the cutoff value of s may depend instead on local recombination rates. This limit to selection in a real population may be captured in a toy Wright-Fisher simulation through the appropriate choice of Ne. Populations with different selection effective population sizes are predicted to evolve profoundly different genome architectures.

See also
 Minimum viable population
 Small population size

References

External links 
 
 
 https://web.archive.org/web/20050524144622/http://www.kursus.kvl.dk/shares/vetgen/_Popgen/genetics/3/6.htm — on Københavns Universitet.

Population genetics
Population ecology
Ecological metrics
Quantitative genetics